Mount Bellenden Ker is the second-highest mountain in Queensland, Australia, with a height of . It is named after the botanist John Bellenden Ker Gawler. The two mountains dominate the Josephine Falls section of the Wooroonooran National Park. Both peaks are made of resistant granite and are remnants of an escarpment that has been eroded by the Russell and Mulgrave Rivers.

Several television transmitter towers have been built on the mountain. The only access to the television transmitter site and the mountain top weather station is by a privately owned cable car.

History
In 1873, Walter Hill, Queensland's first Colonial botanist, undertook an expedition to northern Queensland to collect native plants and included a trip to Mount Bellenden Ker. In the same year Robert Arthur Johnstone climbed the peak while exploring the coastal lands south of Cooktown with George Elphinstone Dalrymple. Another expedition to the summit, led by Archibald Meston (1851-1924), was conducted in early February to early March 1889.

Environment

Birds
The mountain lies in the Wooroonooran Important Bird Area, identified as such by BirdLife International because it supports populations of a range of bird species endemic to Queensland's Wet Tropics.

Climate

In 2006, the mountain received more rainfall –  – than any other part of Australia. This was primarily due to two severe tropical cyclones passing close to the mountain. In 2010, Queensland's wettest year on record, the top station on the mountain recorded , just under the 2000 record.

See also

 Big Bog
 Cherrapunji
 List of mountains in Australia
 Mount Waialeale
 Quibdó
 Wettest places on Earth

References

External links
 Queensland tropical rain forests

Bellenden Ker
Landforms of Far North Queensland
Important Bird Areas of Queensland